Anagawa Station (穴川駅) is the name of two train stations in Japan:

 Anagawa Station (Chiba)
 Anagawa Station (Mie)